Burlington Council may be:

Burlington Council (Iowa)
Burlington Council (New Jersey)
Burlington Council (Vermont)
Burlington County Council (New Jersey)